The 1898–99 Yale Bulldogs men's basketball team represented Yale University in intercollegiate basketball during the 1898–99 season. The team finished the season with a 9–2 record and was retroactively named the national champion by the Premo-Porretta Power Poll.

References

Yale Bulldogs men's basketball seasons
Yale
NCAA Division I men's basketball tournament championship seasons
Yale Bulldogs Men's Basketball Team
Yale Bulldogs Men's Basketball Team